Marina Evseevna Ratner (October 30, 1938 – July 7, 2017) was a professor of mathematics at the University of California, Berkeley who worked in ergodic theory. Around 1990, she proved a group of major theorems concerning unipotent flows on homogeneous spaces, known as Ratner's theorems. Ratner was elected to the American Academy of Arts and Sciences in 1992, awarded the Ostrowski Prize in 1993 and elected to the National Academy of Sciences the same year. In 1994, she was awarded the John J. Carty Award from the National Academy of Sciences.

Biographical information 

Ratner was born in Moscow, Russian SFSR to a Jewish family, where her father was a plant physiologist and her mother a chemist. Ratner's mother was fired from work in the 1940s for writing to her mother in Israel, then considered an enemy of the Soviet state. Ratner gained an interest in mathematics in her fifth grade. From 1956 to 1961, she studied mathematics and physics at  Moscow State University. Here, she became interested in probability theory,  inspired by A.N. Kolmogorov and his group. After graduation, she spent four years working in Kolmogorov's applied statistics group. Following this, she returned to Moscow State university for graduate studies were under Yakov G. Sinai, also a student of Kolmogorov. She completed her PhD thesis, titled "Geodesic Flows on Unit Tangent Bundles of Compact Surfaces of Negative Curvature", in 1969.  In 1971 she emigrated from the Soviet Union to Israel and she taught at the Hebrew University from 1971 until 1975. She began to work with Rufus Bowen at Berkeley and later emigrated to the United States and became a professor of mathematics at Berkeley. Her work included proofs of conjectures dealing with unipotent flows on quotients of Lie groups made by S. G. Dani and M. S. Raghunathan. For this and other work, she won the John J. Carty Award for the Advancement of Science in 1994. she became only the third woman plenary speaker at International Congress of Mathematicians in 1994.

Marina Ratner died July 7, 2017, at the age of 78.

Selected publications

References

1938 births
2017 deaths
American women mathematicians
Fellows of the American Academy of Arts and Sciences
Members of the United States National Academy of Sciences
20th-century American mathematicians
21st-century American mathematicians
Jewish Russian scientists
Jewish American scientists
University of California, Berkeley faculty
Dynamical systems theorists
20th-century women mathematicians
21st-century women mathematicians
Russian women scientists
20th-century Russian mathematicians
20th-century American women
21st-century American women
20th-century Russian women
21st-century American Jews